Vampyromorphida is an order of cephalopods comprising one known extant species (Vampyroteuthis infernalis) and many extinct taxa. Physically, they somewhat resemble octopuses (their closest relatives), but the eight arms are united by a web of skin, and two smaller cilia are also present. Properly speaking, the vampire squid does not possess cilia, but cirri (cilia-like projections).

Classification
Order Vampyromorphida
Suborder †Kelaenina
Family †Muensterellidae
Suborder †Prototeuthina
Family †Loligosepiidae  
Family †Geopeltididae  
Family †Lioteuthididae 
Family †Mastigophoridae 
Suborder †Mesoteuthina
Family †Palaeololiginidae
Subfamily †Teudopseinae
Subfamily †Palaeololigininae
Suborder Vampyromorphina
Family Vampyroteuthidae

The following taxa were long considered to belong to Vampyromorphida, but this placement may be incorrect:
Family †Plesioteuthididae  
Family †Leptotheuthididae 
Family †Trachyteuthididae
Subfamily †Trachyteuthidinae
Subfamily †Actinosepiinae

References

The Taxonomicon: Order Vampyromorphida
Mikko's Phylogeny Archive: Vampyromorpha

Octopodiformes
Cephalopod orders